The year 1596 in science and technology included some significant events.

Astronomy
 David Fabricius discovers the first non-supernova variable star, Omicron Ceti.
 Johannes Kepler's Mysterium Cosmographicum is the first published defense of the Copernican (heliocentric) system of planetary motion.

Botany
 Gaspard Bauhin publishes Pinax theatri botanici, an early classified flora.

Mathematics
 Ludolph van Ceulen computes π to twenty decimal places using inscribed and circumscribed polygons.

Medicine
 William Slingsby discovers that water from the Tewitt Well mineral spring at Harrogate in North Yorkshire, England, possesses similar properties to that from Spa, Belgium.
 Li Shizhen's Compendium of Materia Medica (Bencao Gangmu) is published posthumously in an illustrated edition.

Earth sciences
 Abraham Ortelius, in the last edition of his Thesaurus geographicus, considers the possibility of continental drift.

Exploration
 June 17 – Willem Barents makes the first documented discovery of Spitsbergen in the Svalbard archipelago.

Technology
 John Harington describes the "Ajax", a precursor to the modern flush toilet, in The Metamorphosis of Ajax.

Births
 March 31 – René Descartes (d. 1650), French-born philosopher and mathematician.
 approximate date – Peter Mundy (d. c.1667), English traveller.

Deaths
 January 27 – Sir Francis Drake (b. 1540), English explorer (at sea).
 September 15 – Leonhard Rauwolf (b. either 1535 or 1540), German botanist and physician.
 September – Pieter Dirkszoon Keyser (b. 1540?), Frisian navigator (at sea).

References

 
16th century in science
1590s in science